Constantin Bumbac (born 29 April 1984) is a Romanian footballer who plays as a centre back for Liga IV side Axiopolis Cernavodă. In his career, Bumbac also played for teams such as Cetate Deva, CFR Timișoara, Farul Constanța or Dunărea Călărași, among others.

External links

1984 births
Living people
Sportspeople from Suceava
Romanian footballers
Association football defenders
Liga I players
Liga II players
Liga III players
CSM Jiul Petroșani players
CSM Deva players
CS Corvinul Hunedoara players
FC CFR Timișoara players
FC UTA Arad players
CSM Unirea Alba Iulia players
CS Mioveni players
FC Dunărea Călărași players
FCV Farul Constanța players